George Selgin (born February 15, 1957) is an American economist. He is Senior Fellow and Director Emeritus of the Cato Institute's Center for Monetary and Financial Alternatives, where he is editor-in-chief of the center's blog, Alt-M, Professor Emeritus of economics at the Terry College of Business at the University of Georgia, and an associate editor of Econ Journal Watch. Selgin formerly taught at George Mason University, the University of Hong Kong, and West Virginia University.

Research
Selgin's research covers a broad range of topics within the field of monetary economics, including monetary history, macroeconomic theory, and the history of monetary thought. He is one of the founders, along with Kevin Dowd and Lawrence H. White, of the Modern Free Banking School, which draws its inspiration from the writings of Friedrich Hayek on denationalization of money and choice in currency.  A central claim of the Free Banking School is that the effects of government intervention in monetary systems cannot be properly appreciated except with reference to a theory of monetary laissez-faire, analogous to the theory of free trade that informs the modern understanding of the effects of tariffs and other trade barriers.  The free bankers argue that, viewed in light of such a theory, financial crises and business cycles are largely attributable to misguided government interference with freely-evolved and competitive monetary arrangements, including legislation granting central banks exclusive rights to issue paper currency.

Selgin is also known for his advocacy of a "productivity norm" for monetary policy—an ideal according to which the growth-rate of nominal gross domestic product should be such as will allow the (output) price level to decline along with goods' real (unit) costs of production—that is, at a rate opposite the growth rate of total factor productivity. According to Selgin, by preventing mild deflation in response to productivity gains, monetary authorities risk inadvertently fueling unsustainable booms or economic bubbles, setting the stage for consequent busts and recession. Because it requires that aggregate spending grow at a steady rate equal to the trend growth rate of weighted factor input growth, Selgin's ideal amounts to a version of nominal income targeting, which helped to inspire and inform the post-Great Recession movement favoring NGDP targeting.

Selgin is considered a Bitcoin OG ("Original Gangsta"), having taken part in the original cypherpunk mailing list (with Wei Dei and Nick Szabo) that led to Bitcoin's invention, which Hal Finney and Nick Szabo say he helped to inspire. He was one of the first economists to explore the economics of Bitcoin and other cryptocurrencies. He is also an expert on the history and economics of old-fashioned metallic coinage. His book Good Money tells the story of the private minting of coins during Great Britain's Industrial Revolution. He is one of the foremost authorities on Gresham's Law—the oldest of all economic laws concerning money.

Since he joined the Cato Institute Selgin has become a leading critic of some of the Federal Reserve's post-crisis policies, including its decision to permanently switch to an ample reserves or "floor" operating system, and its decision to build a "real time" retail payments network to compete with one established by commercial bankers. Most recently, he has taken on the growing movement to have the Fed make use of its Quantitative Easing powers, not solely to combat recessions, but as a means for funding ambitious government projects that can bypass Congress's normal appropriations process.

Selgin is the twin brother of author and illustrator Peter Selgin and the half brother of anthropologist Clare Selgin Wolfowitz. His other half-sister, Ann Selgin Levy, is a fabric artist and culinary author. His father, Paul Selgin, was an inventor whose numerous patents include many for optical measuring devices for use in manufacturing.

Education
 Ph.D., Economics, New York University,1986
 B.A., Economics and Zoology, Drew University, 1979

Published works

Books 
 The Menace of Fiscal QE (2020). 
 Floored! How a Misguided Fed Experiment Deepened and Prolonged the Great Recession (2018). 
 Less Than Zero: The Case for a Falling Price Level in a Growing Economy (2018). 
 Money: Free & Unfree (2017). 
 Good Money: Birmingham Button Makers, the Royal Mint, and the Beginnings of Modern Coinage (2008). .
 Less Than Zero: The Case for a Falling Price Level in a Growing Economy (1997). .
 Bank Deregulation and Monetary Order (1996). .
 Readings in Money and Banking (1995). .
 The Theory of Free Banking: Money Supply under Competitive Note Issue (1988). .

Scholarly Articles 
 Selgin, George. (2020). "On Targeting the Price of Gold"
 Selgin, George. (2019)."The Fed's New Operating Framework: How We Got Here and Why We Shouldn't Stay" Cato Journal
 Selgin, George. (2016)."Real and Pseudo Monetary Rules" (2016). Cato Journal
 Selgin, George and Bahadir, Berrak. (2015). "The Productivity Gap: Monetary Policy, the Subprime Boom, and the Post-2011 Productivity Surge". Journal of Policy Modeling
 Selgin, George. (2015)."Law, Legislation, and the Gold Standard".Cato Journal
 Selgin, George. (2014)."Operation Twist-the-Truth: How the Federal Reserve Misrepresents Its History and Performance". Cato Journal
 Selgin, George. (2013). "Those Dishonest Goldsmiths". Financial History Review
 Selgin, George. (2013) "Synthetic Commodity Money". Journal of Financial Stability
 Selgin, George. (2013)."Incredible Commitments: Why the EMU Is Destroying Both Europe and Itself". Cato Journal
 Selgin, George, Lastrapes, William D., and White, Lawrence H.. (2012)."Has the Fed Been a Failure?". Journal of Macroeconomics
 Selgin, George and Lastrapes, William. (2012). "Banknotes and Economic Growth". Scottish Journal of Political Economy
 Selgin, George. (2012)."L Street: Bagehotian Prescriptions for a 21st Century Money Market". Cato Journal
 Selgin, George and Turner, John. (2011) "Strong Steam, Weak Patents, or, the Myth of Watt's Innovation-Blocking Monopoly, Exploded". Journal of Law & Economics
 Selgin, George. (2010)."The Futility of Central Banking". Cato Journal
 Selgin, George. (2010). "Mere Quibbles: Bagus and Howden's Critique of the Theory of Free Banking". Review of Austrian Economics
 Selgin, George. (2010). "Central Banks as Sources of Financial Instability". The Independent Review
 Selgin, George. (2009). "The Institutional Roots of Great Britain's 'Big Problem of Small Change'." European Review of Economic History
 Selgin, George and Turner, John. (2009). "Watt, Again? Boldrin and Levine Still Exaggerate the Adverse Effects of Patents on the Progress of Steam Power." Review of Law and Economics
 Selgin, George. (2009). "100 Percent Reserve Money: The Small Change Challenge." Quarterly Journal of Austrian Economics
 Selgin, George. (2008)."Milton Friedman and the Case against Currency Monopoly". Cato Journal
 Selgin, George and VanHoose, D.. (2007). "The Euro and World Inflation." Oxford Economic Papers
 Selgin, George and Turner, John. (2006). "James Watt as Intellectual Monopolist: Comment on Boldrin and Levine." International Economics Review
 Selgin, George and White, Lawrence. (2005). "Credible Currency: A Constitutionalist Perspective." Constitutional Political Economy
 Selgin, George. (2005). "Charles Wyatt, Manager of the Parys Mine Mint: A Study in Ingratitude."  British Numismatic Journal
 Selgin, George. (2005)."Currency Privatization as a Substitute for Currency Boards and Dollarization". Cato Journal
 Selgin, George. (2004). "Wholesale Payments: Questioning the Market-Failure Hypothesis." International Review of Law and Economics
 Selgin, George. (2003). "Steam, Hot Air, and Small Change: Matthew Boulton and the Reform of Britain's Coinage." The Economic History Review
 Selgin, George. (2003). "Adaptive Learning and the Transition to Fiat Money." The Economic Journal
 Selgin, George. (2001). "In-Concert Overexpansion and the Precautionary Demand for Bank Reserves." Journal of Money, Credit, and Banking
 Selgin, George. (2001)."You Call That Deregulation? A Critical Examination of Hugh Thomas's Proposal to Deregulate Banking". Cato Journal
 Selgin, George. (2000). "The Suppression of State Bank Notes: A Reconsideration." Economic Inquiry
 Selgin, George. (1999). "Hayek versus Keynes on How the Price Level Ought to Behave." History of Political Economy
 Selgin, George and Taylor, Jason. (1999). "By Our Bootstraps: Origins and Effects of the High-Wage Doctrine"Journal of Labor Research
 Selgin, George and White, Lawrence. (1999). "A Fiscal Theory of Governments' Role in Money"Economic Inquiry
 Selgin, George. (2000)."World Monetary Policy After The Echo". Cato Journal
 Selgin, George. (1999)."Ludwig von Mises and the Case for Gold". Cato Journal
 Selgin, George. (1999). "A Plea for (Mild) Deflation". Cato Journal
 Selgin, George. (1997). "A Regulatory Placebo? Or, the Strange Case of Dr. Kaufman and Mr. Seir". Cato Journal
 Selgin, George and Lastrapes, William. (1997). "The Check Tax: Fiscal Folly and the Great Monetary Contraction" Journal of Economic History
 Selgin, George and White, Lawrence. (1997). "The Option Clause in Scottish Banking" Journal of Money, Credit, and Banking
 Selgin, George. (1996). "Salvaging Gresham's Law: the Good, the Bad, and the Illegal." Journal of Money, Credit, and Banking
 Selgin, George and White, Lawrence. (1996). "In Defense of Fiduciary Media" Review of Austrian Economics
 Selgin, George and Foldvary, Fred. (1995). "The Dependency of Wage Contracts on Monetary Policy" Journal of Institutional and Theoretical Economics
 Selgin, George. (1995). "The Case for a 'Productivity Norm': Comment on Dowd." Journal of Macroeconomics
 Selgin, George. (1995). "The 'Productivity Norm'  vs.  Zero Inflation in the History of Economic Thought." History of Political Economy
 Selgin, George and Lastrapes, William. (1995). "The Liquidity Effect:  Identifying Short-Run Interest Rate Dynamics using Long-Run Restrictions" Journal of Macroeconomics
 Selgin, George. (1995). "Bank Self-Regulation: Comment on Bordo and Schwartz". Cato Journal
 Selgin, George and White, Lawrence. (1994). "How Would the Invisible Hand Handle Money?" Journal of Economic Literature
 Selgin, George. (1994). "Free Banking and Monetary Control."  Economic Journal
 Selgin, George and White, Lawrence. (1994). "Monetary Reform and the Redemption of National Bank Notes, 1863–1913" Business History Review
 Selgin, George. (1994). "On Ensuring the Acceptability of a New Fiat Money." Journal of Money, Credit, and Banking
 Selgin, George and Lastrapes, William. (1994). "Buffer-Stock Money:  Interpreting Short-Run Dynamics Using Long-Run Restrictions" Journal of Money, Credit, and Banking
 Selgin, George. (1994). "Are Banking Crises Free-Market Phenomena?" Critical Review
 Selgin, George. (1994). "Banking is Different, Because it is Regulated." Cato Journal
 Selgin, George. (1993). "In Defense of Bank Suspension."  Journal of Financial Services Research
 Selgin, George. (1992). "On Foot-Loose Prices and Forecast-Free Monetary Regimes." Cato Journal
 Selgin, George. (1992). "Bank Lending 'Manias' in Theory and History."  Journal of Financial Services Research
 Selgin, George and White, Lawrence. (1990). "Laissez‑Faire Monetary Theorists in Late Nineteenth Century America" Southern Economic Journal
 Selgin, George and Boudreaux, Don. (1990). "L. Albert Hahn:  Precursor of Keynesianism and the 'Monetarist Counterrevolution'" History of Political Economy
 Selgin, George and White, Lawrence. (1990). "Laissez‑Faire Monetary Thought in Jacksonian America" Perspectives on the History of Economic Thought
 Selgin, George. (1990). "Why Does Europe Want a Federal Reserve System?" Cato Journal
 Selgin, George. (1990). "Monetary Equilibrium and the Productivity Norm of Price-Level Policy". Cato Journal
 Selgin, George. (1989). "Legal Restrictions, Financial Weakening, and the Lender of Last Resort". Cato Journal
 Selgin, George. (1989). "The Analytical Framework of the Real‑Bills Doctrine."  Journal of Institutional and Theoretical Economics
 Selgin, George. (1989). "Commercial Banks as Pure Intermediaries:  Between 'Old' and 'New' Views."  Southern Economic Journal
 Selgin, George. (1989). "Legal Restrictions, Financial Weakening, and the Lender of Last Resort."  Cato Journal
 Selgin, George. (1988). "The Stability and Efficiency of Money Supply under Free Banking."  Journal of Institutional and Theoretical Economics
 Selgin, George. (1988). "Praxeology and Understanding."  Review of Austrian Economics
 Selgin, George and White, Lawrence. (1988). "Competitive Monies and the Suffolk System:  Comment" Southern Economic Journal
 Selgin, George. (1988)."Central Banking:  Myth and Reality."  Hong Kong Economic Papers
 Selgin, George. (1988). "Accommodating Changes in the Relative Demand for Currency: Free Banking vs. Central Banking". Cato Journal
 Selgin, George and White, Lawrence. (1987). "The Evolution of a Free Banking System." Economic Inquiry

References

External links

 Selgin's Alt-M (blog) page
 Selgin's Cato biography
 Center for Monetary and Financial Alternatives
 Selgin's faculty homepage
 Interview of Selgin in the Federal Reserve Bank of Richmond's Region Focus (Winter 2009) 
 
 , lecture on "The Private Supply of Money" (recorded at the annual Austrian Scholars Conference, Ludwig von Mises Institute, 14 March 2009)
 
 "Me, Murray, and Milton" (Selgin on Austrian economics; July 28, 2011) 
 George Selgin at Mises.org
 

Austrian School economists
1957 births
Living people
University of Georgia faculty
Monetary economists
Drew University alumni